Debut or début (the first  public appearance of a person or thing) may refer to:

 Debut (society), the formal introduction of young upper-class women to society
 Debut novel, an author's first published novel

Film and television
 The Debut (1977 film), or Het debuut by Nouchka van Brakel
 The Debut (2000 film), a Filipino–American drama film 
 Debut (film), a 2017 Belarusian documentary film 
 "The Debut" (The O.C. episode), 2003

Music

 Debut Records, an American jazz record label
 Debut (Björk album), 1993
 Debut (Zoë album), 2015
 The Debut (album), a 2019 album by Jackie Evancho
 Debut Album (Sayuri Ishikawa album), 1973
 Debut, a 1987 album by The Real Group
 Debut, a 2004 album by Carol Kidd
 Debut, a 2007 album by Brandi Disterheft
 Debut, a 1991 album by Field Marshal Montgomery Pipe Band
 Debut, a 1992 album by Sarah Chang, 1992
 Debut: The Clef/Mercury Duo Recordings 1949-1951, a 2009 re-release of a 1956 Oscar Peterson album
 Debut, a 1955 album by Malcolm Mitchell

See also 

 List of directorial debuts, a list of director's first commercial cinematic releases
 New product development
 First appearance of a character in comic books